Meyer Jerison (November 28, 1922 – March 13, 1995) was an American mathematician known for his work in functional analysis and rings, and especially for collaborating with Leonard Gillman on one of the standard texts in the field: Rings of Continuous Functions.

Jerison immigrated in 1929 from Poland to New York City, and was naturalized in 1933. He earned a bachelor's degree in 1943 from City College of New York and a master's degree in applied math in 1947 from Brown University. In 1945, he married the former Miriam Schwartz. He earned a Ph.D. in mathematics in 1950 from the University of Michigan under Sumner Myers with a dissertation entitled "The Space of Bounded Maps Into a Banach Space."

Jerison worked briefly at NACA in Cleveland and at Lockheed Corporation. He joined the mathematics faculty at Purdue University in 1951, where he spent the remainder of his career, retiring in 1991.

References

External links
 

1922 births
1995 deaths
20th-century American mathematicians
Polish emigrants to the United States
Brown University alumni
University of Michigan alumni
Purdue University faculty